Robert Akira Nakamura (born July 5, 1936, Venice, California) is a filmmaker and teacher, sometimes referred to as "the Godfather of Asian American media."  In 1970 he cofounded Visual Communications (VC) the oldest community-based Asian Pacific American media arts organization in the United States.

Personal
Nakamura was born in Venice, California to an Issei father and Nisei mother. He is a graduate of Art Center College of Design (B.A., 1966) and the UCLA School of Theater, Film and Television (M.F.A., 1975).  He left a successful career in  photojournalism and advertising photography to become one of the first to explore, interpret and present the experiences of Japanese Americans in film.  He is married to his longtime producing partner, Karen L. Ishizuka, and has two children, Thai Binh and Tadashi, who is also a filmmaker.

Filmmaker
Nakamura's personal documentary Manzanar (1972) revisited childhood memories of incarceration in an American concentration camp during World War II and has been selected for major retrospectives on the documentary form at the San Francisco Museum of Art and Film Forum, Museum of Contemporary Art, Los Angeles. In 1980 he co-directed Hito Hata: Raise the Banner, considered to be one of the first Asian American feature films, produced by and about Asian Americans. He is the recipient of more than 30 national awards.  He was the first to receive Visual Communications' Steve Tatsukawa Memorial Award in 1985 for leadership in Asian American media.  In 1994 the Asian Pacific American Coalition in Cinema, Theatre & Television of UCLA instituted the "Robert A. Nakamura Award" to recognize outstanding contributions of other Asian Pacific American visual artists. In 1996 he founded the UCLA Center for EthnoCommunications.  In 1997, the Smithsonian Institution presented a retrospective of his work. Also that year he created (with Ishizuka) the Frank H. Watase Media Arts Center at the Japanese American National Museum. In 1999 he was named the Japanese American Alumni Professor of Japanese American Studies at UCLA, where he is presently an emeritus professor. Nakamura's film Manzanar was preserved by the Academy Film Archive in 2011.

Filmography
 Manzanar (1972)
 Wataridori: Birds of Passage (1975)
 Hito Hata: Raise the Banner (1980)
 Fool's Dance (1980)
 Moving Memories (1993)
 Looking Like the Enemy (1995)
 Toyo Miyatake: Infinite Shades of Gray (2002)

References

External links
  Biography of Nakamura at the UCLA Asian American Studies Center based on an encyclopedia article. 
 
. Several films directed by Robert Nakamura can be viewed on a Vimeo channel.

1936 births
American documentary filmmakers
Japanese-American internees
American film directors of Japanese descent
UCLA Film School alumni
Living people